Stygnocoris rusticus is a species of dirt-colored seed bug in the family Rhyparochromidae. It is found in Africa, Europe and Northern Asia (excluding China), and North America.

Subspecies
These two subspecies belong to the species Stygnocoris rusticus:
 Stygnocoris rusticus agricolus (Westhoff, 1884)
 Stygnocoris rusticus rusticus (Fallen, 1807)

References

External links
Stygnocoris rusticus images at  Consortium for the Barcode of Life

Rhyparochromidae
Articles created by Qbugbot
Insects described in 1807
Taxa named by Carl Fredrik Fallén